Ons Jabeur defeated Daria Kasatkina in the final, 7–5, 6–4, to win the singles tennis title at the 2021 Birmingham Classic. By winning her first career singles title on her third attempt, Jabeur became the first Tunisian and Arab woman to win a singles title on the WTA Tour.

Ashleigh Barty was the defending champion from when the event was last held in 2019, but she chose to play in Berlin instead, where she later withdrew from due to injury.

Seeds

Draw

Finals

Top half

Bottom half

Qualifying

Seeds

Qualifiers

Qualifying draw

First qualifier

Second qualifier

Third qualifier

Fourth qualifier

Fifth qualifier

Sixth qualifier

References

External links 
 Main Draw
 Qualifying Draw
 
 WTA website

2021 WTA Tour
Singles 2021
2021 in English tennis
Birmingham Classic